František Šimůnek (2 December 1910 – 17 July 1989) was a Czechoslovakian Nordic skier who competed in the 1930s. He won a silver medal in the 4 x 10 km at the 1933 FIS Nordic World Ski Championships in Innsbruck.

Šimůnek was born in Zlatá Olešnice in December 1910. He finished 8th in the Nordic combined and 23rd in ski jumping at the 1932 Winter Olympics in Lake Placid. Four years later he finished 5th in both the 4 x 10 km cross-country and the Nordic combined, and 11th in the 18 km cross-country event at the 1936 Winter Olympics in Garmisch-Partenkirchen. He also competed in the 1948 Winter Olympics held in St. Moritz. He finished 36th in Nordic combined and 72nd in 18 km event.

He died in Řendějov on 17 July 1989, at the age of 78.

References

External links 
 
 
 Postcard of Šimůnek (5th one from the top) 

1910 births
1989 deaths
People from Jablonec nad Nisou District
People from the Kingdom of Bohemia
Czech male cross-country skiers
Czech male ski jumpers
Czech male Nordic combined skiers
Czechoslovak male cross-country skiers
Ski jumpers at the 1932 Winter Olympics
Cross-country skiers at the 1936 Winter Olympics
Cross-country skiers at the 1948 Winter Olympics
Nordic combined skiers at the 1932 Winter Olympics
Nordic combined skiers at the 1936 Winter Olympics
Nordic combined skiers at the 1948 Winter Olympics
FIS Nordic World Ski Championships medalists in cross-country skiing
Sportspeople from the Liberec Region